Ukrainskoye is a rural locality (a selo) in Chernyayevsky Selsoviet, Kizlyarsky District, Republic of Dagestan, Russia. The population was 209 as of 2010. There is 1 street.

Geography 
Ukrainskoye is located 36 km northeast of Kizlyar (the district's administrative centre) by road. Sangishi and Burumbay are the nearest rural localities.

Nationalities 
Avars, Chechens, Tsakhurs, Russians and Tabasarans live there.

References 

Rural localities in Kizlyarsky District